A moderator is an official of an incorporated town who presides over the town meeting, and in some cases, other municipal meetings. In the United States, the New England town is best known for the town meeting form of government. The office of moderator exists in at least Connecticut (Mandell c. 2007), Maine, Massachusetts, New Hampshire, Rhode Island (Advisory Opinion No. 2009-5 2009) and Vermont.

Maine
The moderator serves for the duration of the meeting at which he or she is elected. The election of the moderator is presided over by the town clerk. (Maine Moderators Manual 1989)

Massachusetts
Massachusetts moderators serve a term of one or three years, depending on the choice of each town. Vacancies in the office of moderator are filled by the voters. If the moderator is absent from a meeting, the voters elect a temporary moderator. (Moderators; election; tenure; vacancies; assistant moderators n.d.)

Some town moderators have the ability to directly appoint the town's finance committee; and in other towns, appoint a committee to appoint the finance committee.

New Hampshire
Moderators serve for two years, beginning at the conclusion of the meeting at which they are elected (or when they qualify, if later). (Government of town meeting: moderator 1996) In addition to presiding at town meeting, moderators are the chief election officials. (Exercising a Public Trust: Voting October 2008)'

In cities, moderators are in charge of polling places.

Vermont
Before there were selectboards, clerks or treasurers in Vermont, even before there were established towns, there were moderators.  When Governor Benning Wentworth chartered the first Vermont town in 1749, he appointed Col. William Williams to be the moderator of Bennington's first meeting, "which he is to Notify and Govern according to the Laws & Custom of our Said Province." (Colbert 2008)

Vermont town meetings usually include two phases. The open discussion and voting by voice vote (with occasional paper ballots) occurs the first day, and is presided over by the moderator. The Australian ballot generally occurs the next day, and is presided over by the town clerk. In addition to town meetings, "moderators are needed by town school districts, union school districts, villages, and fire districts."(Colbert 2008)

Town moderators are elected at the annual meeting and serve a one-year term. Usually towns have only one town meeting per year; this is the annual meeting. The moderator of a meeting will have been elected at the previous annual meeting. (Colbert 2008)

It is important for moderators to be familiar with Roberts Rules of Order because these rules govern the town meeting (except when superseded by state law). The voters may appeal a ruling by the moderator and vote to overrule the moderator. (Colbert 2008)

References

 Advisory Opinion No. 2009-5. (2009). Rhode Island Ethics Commission. Retrieved August 10, 2009.
 Colbert, G. (2008). A Handbook for Vermont Moderators. Montpelier: Office of the Vermont Secretary of State. Retrieved August 10, 2009.
 Exercising a Public Trust: Voting. (October 2008). New Hampshire Local Government Center. Retrieved August 10, 2009.
 "Government of town meeting: moderator. (1996). Revised statutes 40:1. New Hampshire General Court. Retrieved August 10, 2009.
 Maine Moderators Manual. (1989). Town of Raymond, Maine. Retrieved August 10, 2009.
 Mandell, J. (c. 2007). Town Moderator. Town of Simsbury. Retrieved August 10, 2009.
 "Moderators; election; tenure; vacancies; assistant moderators."  (n.d.). General Laws of Massachusetts Ch. 39 Sec. 14. State of Massachusetts. Retrieved August 10, 2009.

Meetings
Local government in the United States
Local government in Maine
Local government in New Hampshire
Local government in Vermont
Local government in Massachusetts
Local government in Connecticut
Local government in Rhode Island
New England towns
New England